Ballot Measure 50 was a legislatively referred state statute ballot measure for the November 6, 2007 special election ballot in the state of Oregon. This measure would have increased the tobacco tax and dedicated the new revenue to providing health care for children, low-income adults and other medically underserved Oregonians, and to fund tobacco prevention and education programs. The proposal would have increased the tax on cigarettes by 84.5 cents per pack, and increased the tax on other tobacco products.

The purpose of the fund would have been to finance the Healthy Kids Program created by the 2007 legislature to provide affordable health care for uninsured children. The measure would have funded tobacco prevention programs, safety net clinics, rural health care and health care for Oregon’s lowest income families and individuals through the Oregon Health Plan. The campaigns for and against the measure spent the most money ever on a ballot measure election in the state's history. Because the measure did not pass, these health care programs were not expanded, and the Healthy Kids Program did not become law.

See also 
 Blanket primary
 2007 Oregon's statewide elections
 List of Oregon ballot measures

Notes

External links 
 Voters' Pamphlet from the Oregon Secretary of State

2007 Oregon ballot measures
Tobacco taxation
Smoking in the United States
Rejected amendments to the Constitution of Oregon
Healthcare reform in Oregon
Health in Oregon